Agonoxena is a genus of moths of the family Agonoxenidae.

Species
Agonoxena argaula Meyrick, 1921 (coconut leafminer)
Agonoxena pyrogramma  Meyrick, 1924
Agonoxena miniana (Meyrick, 1926)
Agonoxena phoenicea Bradley, 1966

References

Agonoxeninae
Moth genera